Kelvin Osemudiamen Ehibhatiomhan (born 23 April 2003) is an English-Nigerian professional footballer who plays as a forward for the EFL Championship club Reading.

Career
On 2 July 2021, Ehibhatiomhan signed his first professional contract with Reading. Ehibhatiomhan made his professional debut with the club in a 3–0 EFL Cup loss to Swansea City on 10 August 2021, and then made his league debut for Reading on 6 August 2022, coming on as a late substitute for Shane Long in Reading’s 2-1 victory over Cardiff City.

He scored his first goal for Reading in an EFL Cup tie against Stevenage on 9 August 2022.

Personal life
Having grown up in England, Ehibhatiomhan was born in Benin City and is of Nigerian descent.

Career statistics

References

External links
 

2003 births
Living people
Sportspeople from Benin City
Nigerian footballers
English footballers
Nigerian emigrants to the United Kingdom
Reading F.C. players
Association football forwards
English Football League players
Nigerian expatriate footballers
Nigerian expatriate sportspeople in the United Kingdom